The Pemberton Festival was a three-day summer music festival inaugurated in 2008.  It was held in Pemberton, British Columbia, a village just north of popular ski resort Whistler.  Produced by Live Nation Canada, the festival featured primarily rock and indie rock musicians, with a small proportion of hip hop.  Musicians played on one of two stages, picturesquely situated at the foot of Mount Currie and the surrounding mountain range.  The site, a  hayfield, was discovered by concert-promoter, Shane Bourbonnais, of Live Nation, just down the street from his home. He emphasized event sustainability and environmentalism as priorities in running the festival.

On January 8, 2009, Live Nation officially announced the cancellation of the 2009 event and instead, was going to focus on the planning of the 2010 comeback.

On January 19, 2010, Live Nation announced the cancellation of the 2010 event.

Festival Site

Campgrounds
The campground was connected directly to the festival grounds and allowed people to travel to and from their campsites whenever they please.

Dance Tent
The B-Live dance tent sponsored by Bacardi featured one main stage, sitting areas, bars, and a large dance floor. DJ's playing mostly electronic dance music performed throughout the weekend.  A custom live video remix wall and a thunderous sound system were also included.

Limited access to the tent that had a capacity limit of 2,500 was seen as a large drawback for many electronic music lovers at the festival. Line-ups were long and many people didn't get to see the artists they wanted to see. But those that were lucky enough to gain access saw some of top DJ's of the day.

2008
The festival's inaugural year, was held between July 25–27, 2008, and was headlined by Coldplay, Tom Petty and the Heartbreakers, Jay-Z, Nine Inch Nails, Tragically Hip, and the Flaming Lips.

At first, the festival was only available as a full three-day pass, thus, festival-goers were encouraged to camp out on the festival's camping grounds, while additional accommodation was available in the form of neighbouring hotels, inns and lodges. However, as of June 13, 2008, single day tickets were made available. In total, 40,000 people were expected for the first year of the festival.

The full line-up:

Interpol
Serj Tankian
The Flaming Lips
Coldplay
Tom Petty and The Heartbreakers
Death Cab for Cutie
My Morning Jacket
Jay Z
The Tragically Hip
Sam Roberts Band
Metric
Black Mountain
Vampire Weekend
The Crystal Method DJ Set
DJ Shadow and Cut Chemist
Booka Shade
Junkie XL
Dave Seaman
Wintersleep
Buck 65
Secret Machines
MSTRKRFT
Deadmau5
Brazilian Girls
The Fiery Furnaces
Mates of State
Grand Ole Party
Nine Inch Nails
Carolina Liar
Airborne Toxic Event
Monte Negro
Low Vs Diamond
Annie Stela
M.A.N.D.Y.
Tommie Sunshine
Chromeo
3OH!3
Kevin Shiu
Timeline
Tony Pantages
N.E.R.D.
Minus the Bear
Matisyahu
Inward Eye
Kathleen Edwards
Wolfmother
Shearwater

References

Rock festivals in Canada
Music festivals in British Columbia
Recurring events disestablished in 2009
Electronic music festivals in Canada
Music festivals established in 2008